Voices is the third full-length album by Singaporean grindcore band Wormrot. It was released on October 14, 2016 on Earache Records.

Track listing

References

2016 albums
Earache Records albums
Wormrot albums